Draconic is a Serbian heavy metal band.

Draconic may also refer to:

 Of or pertaining to a dragon
 Of or pertaining to the constellation Draco
 A harsh punishment, in reference to the Greek lawgiver Draco
 The fictional language used in the video game The Elder Scrolls V: Skyrim
 The fictional language used in the table top role-playing game franchise Dungeons and Dragons
 Draconic period, an orbital period

See also
 Draco (disambiguation)
 Draconian (disambiguation)